Melissa Samoskevich (born March 31, 1997) is an American ice hockey player and an assistant coach for the Penn State Nittany Lions women's ice hockey program. She plays for the Connecticut Whale of the National Women's Hockey League (NWHL; now called PHF). 

A former member of the United States women's national ice hockey team, she won a gold medal at the 2019 IIHF Women's World Championship.

Playing career
Across 144 NCAA games with the Quinnipiac Bobcats women's ice hockey program, Samoskevich scored 109 points, the fourth highest total in the university's history. She was named ECAC Hockey Rookie of the Year in 2016, and would serve as the team's captain in her two final seasons.

She was drafted by the Connecticut Whale 2nd overall in the 2018 NWHL Draft. She would sign her first professional contract with Brynäs IF Dam in the Swedish Women's Hockey League (SDHL) for the 2019–20 season, but would only play 8 games with the club before leaving due to homesickness. She spent the rest of the 2019–20 season with the New England chapter of the Professional Women's Hockey Players Association (PWHPA), and appeared with Team Coyne at the Secret Women’s Hockey Showcase.

In June 2020, she signed with the Connecticut Whale. On August 18, 2020, Samsokevich was announced as a new assistant coach for the Penn State Nittany Lions women's ice hockey program. Her coaching duties with Penn State prevented her from joining the Whale for the COVID-19 Bubble of the 2020–21 NWHL season.

International play
She represented the United States at the 2019 IIHF Women's World Championship. She had previously represented the country at the 2018 4 Nations Cup and the IIHF World Women's U18 Championship in 2014 and 2015.

Personal life
Samoskevich attended Shattuck-Saint Mary's for high school and played ice hockey with the school's under-16 and prep teams, serving as captain of Shattuck St. Mary's Prep during her senior season. She has a degree in history. Her sister, Madison, represented the United States at the 2019 IIHF World Women's U18 Championship and, since the 2020–21 season, plays as a defenseman with the Quinnipiac Bobcats ice hockey program. Her brother, Mackie, is committed to play college ice hockey for the Michigan Wolverines and was drafted 24th overall by the Florida Panthers in the 2021 NHL Entry Draft.

Career Statistics

References

External links
 

1997 births
Living people
American women's ice hockey forwards
Sportspeople from Bridgeport, Connecticut
Ice hockey players from Connecticut
Connecticut Whale (PHF) players
Professional Women's Hockey Players Association players
Brynäs IF Dam players
Quinnipiac Bobcats women's ice hockey players